The Watts Towers, Towers of Simon Rodia, or Nuestro Pueblo ("our town" in Spanish) are a collection of 17 interconnected sculptural towers, architectural structures, and individual sculptural features and mosaics within the site of the artist's original residential property in Watts, Los Angeles. The entire site of towers, structures, sculptures, pavement and walls were designed and built solely by Sabato ("Simon" or "Sam") Rodia (1879 or 1886 to 1965), an Italian immigrant construction worker and tile mason, over a period of 33 years from 1921 to 1954. The work is an example of outsider art (or Art Brut) and Italian-American naïve art.

The Watts Towers were designated a National Historic Landmark and a California Historical Landmark in 1990. They are also a Los Angeles Historic-Cultural Monument, and one of nine folk art sites listed in the National Register of Historic Places in Los Angeles. The Watts Towers of Simon Rodia State Historic Park encompasses the Watts Towers site.

Simon Rodia
Sabato ("Simon" or "Sam") Rodia (February 12, 1879 (?) – July 17, 1965) was born and raised in Serino, Italy. In 1895, aged fifteen, he emigrated to the United States with his brother.  Rodia lived in Pennsylvania until his brother died in a mining incident. He then moved to Seattle, Washington, where he married Lucia Ucci in 1902. They soon moved to Oakland, where Rodia's three children were born. Following his divorce around 1909, he moved to Long Beach and worked at odd jobs before finally settling in Watts in 1920. Rodia began constructing the Watts Towers in 1921. 

There has been some question as to what Rodia was called during his lifetime; some sources have cited that his birth name was "Sabatino" and it is disputed as to if he was called "Simon" during his lifetime. It is widely known and accepted that he was referred to as "Sam" by close friends. He appears as Samuel Rodia (and still living in Oakland) in the 1910 U.S. Census, but by the time of the 1920 U.S. Census, he had already become Sam Rodia. His surname has also been misspelled as "Rodella" or "Rodilla".

He appears on the iconic cover of the Sgt. Pepper's Lonely Hearts Club album by The Beatles (top right corner, to the left of and behind Bob Dylan).

Design and construction
The sculptures' armatures are constructed from steel rebar and Rodia's own concoction of a type of concrete, wrapped with wire mesh. The main supports are embedded with pieces of porcelain, tile, and glass. They are decorated with found objects, including bottles, ceramic tiles, seashells, figurines, mirrors, and much more. Rodia called the Towers "Nuestro Pueblo" ("our town" in Spanish). He built them with no special equipment or predetermined design, working alone with hand tools. Neighborhood children brought pieces of broken pottery to Rodia, and he also used damaged pieces from Malibu Potteries and CALCO (California Clay Products Company). Green glass includes recognizable soft drink bottles from the 1930s through 1950s, some still bearing the former logos of 7 Up, Squirt, Bubble Up, and Canada Dry; blue glass appears to be from milk of magnesia bottles.

Rodia bent much of the Towers' framework from scrap rebar, using nearby railroad tracks as a makeshift vise. Other items came from alongside the Pacific Electric Railway right-of-way between Watts and Wilmington.

In the summer of 1954, Rodia suffered a mild stroke. Shortly after the stroke, he fell off a tower from a low height. In 1955, Rodia gave his property to a neighbor and left, reportedly tired of battling with the City of Los Angeles for permits, and because he understood the possible consequences of his aging and being alone. He also mentioned that the towers were frequently vandalized by neighbors. He moved to Martinez, California, to be with his sister. He remained there for the next eleven years until his death in 1965.

Preservation after Rodia
Rodia's bungalow inside the enclosure burned down as a result of an accident on the Fourth of July 1956, and the City of Los Angeles condemned the structure and ordered it all to be destroyed. Actor Nicholas King and film editor William Cartwright visited the site in 1959, and purchased the property from Rodia's neighbor for $2,000 in order to preserve it. The City's decision to pursue expediting the demolition was still in force. The towers had already become famous and there was opposition from around the world. King, Cartwright, architects, artists, enthusiasts, academics, and community activists formed the Committee for Simon Rodia's Towers in Watts. The Committee negotiated with the city to allow for an engineering test to establish the safety of the structures and avoid their demolition.

Tests conducted October 10, 1959, found that the towers were capable of withstanding lateral forces of up to 10,000 lbs.

Conservation and damage 
The Committee for Simon Rodia's Towers preserved the site independently until 1975 when, for the purpose of guardianship, they partnered with the City of Los Angeles and then with the State of California in 1978. The Towers are operated by the City of Los Angeles Cultural Affairs Department and curated by the Watts Towers Arts Center/Charles Mingus Youth Arts Center, which grew out of the Youth Arts Classes established in the house structure more than 50 years ago.

In February 2011, the Los Angeles County Museum of Art received a grant from the James Irvine Foundation to scientifically assess and report on the condition of the Watts Towers, to continue to preserve the undisturbed structural integrity and composition of the aging works of art.  Weather and moisture caused pieces of tile and glass to become loose on the towers, which are conserved for reattachment in the ongoing restoration work. The structures suffered little from the 1994 Northridge earthquake in the region, with only a few pieces shaken loose. An extensive three-year restoration project by the Los Angeles County Museum of Art began in 2017 and suspends public tours within the site (tours outside of the fenced towers and sculptures are still available).

California Historic Landmark marker 
California Historic Landmark Marker on the site reads:
NO. 993 WATTS TOWERS OF SIMON RODIA – The Watts Towers are perhaps the nation's best known work of folk art sculpture. Using simple hand tools, cast off materials (glass, shell, pottery pieces and broken tile) Italian immigrant Simon Rodia spent 30 years building a tribute to his adopted country and a monument to the spirit of individuals who make their dreams tangible. Rodia's Towers inspired many to rally and preserve his work and protect it for the future.

Special exhibits 
The Los Angeles County Museum of Art mounted a photographic exhibition, Simon Rodia’s Towers in Watts: A Photographic Exhibition, which was the first museum exhibition on the art or Simon Rodia and the towers.

Two artist interviews, "Watts Towers Q&A with Dominique Moody" and "Q&A With Artist Alison Saar About Her Connection to Watts Towers," were produced in 2012 by the Los Angeles County Museum of Art as part of its Exhibitions on View series.

In popular culture 

The Simon Rodia Continuation High School in Watts is named for Simon Rodia.

Literature 
Jazz musician Charles Mingus mentioned Rodia's Towers in his 1971 autobiography Beneath the Underdog, writing about his childhood fascination with Rodia and his work. There is also a reference to the work in Don DeLillo's novel Underworld.

California-based poet Robert Duncan featured Rodia's Towers in his 1959 poem, "Nel Mezzo del Cammin di Nostra Vita," as an example of democratic art that is free of church/state power structures.

In his book White Sands Geoff Dyer writes about his visit to the Watts Towers in the chapter "The Ballad of Jimmy Garrison".

Film

 The 1957 short documentary film The Towers, by William Hale, includes voice recordings of Rodia and footage of the artist at work. The film incorrectly refers to the artist as "Simon Rodilla". The film was preserved by the Academy Film Archive in 2009.
 In the 1967 movie Good Times, Sonny & Cher dance around in one of the towers.
 In the 1972 movie Melinda the title character is taken to see the towers.
 In the 1973 concert documentary Wattstax the towers are repeatedly featured from multiple vantages.
 The climax of the 1976 blaxploitation movie Dr. Black, Mr. Hyde takes place at the towers.
 The climax of the 1977 blaxploitation movie Abar, the First Black Superman takes place at the towers.  
 The 1988 movie Colors ends with Sean Penn near the towers.
 The 1991 movie Ricochet, starring Denzel Washington, climaxes with Washington's character swinging on the towers.
 The 1993 movie CB4 shows Chris Elliott recording a piece for his character's documentary in front of the towers.
 The 1993 movie Menace II Society shows the towers at the beginning of the 1993 introduction.
 The 2006 documentary I Build the Tower focuses on Rodia, and his creative vision and skill in building the Towers. The 1987 docudrama Daniel and The Towers is about them also. The Towers of Simon Rodia is a 2008 documentary filmed in digital 3-D.
 The 2016 movie La La Land shows the film's main characters visiting the towers in a montage sequence.

Television
The Watts Towers were highlighted in the 1973 BBC television series The Ascent of Man, written and presented by Jacob Bronowski, in the episode "The Grain in the Stone—tools, and the development of architecture and sculpture".
 The 1987 movie Daniel and the Towers, starring Miguel Alamo, made for TV movie tells the story of Simon Rodia and his relationship with fictional neighborhood troublemaker Daniel.

 The towers were also depicted on The Simpsons episode "Angry Dad: The Movie".
 The towers are referenced in Dragnet season 3 episode 4.
 The towers appear and are discussed by student artists Claire Fisher and Russel Corwin in "Nobody Sleeps", the Season 3 Episode 4 of Six Feet Under.
 The towers appear and are discussed in 2017 Season 1, Episode 1 of the Amazon Originals production of the documentary film Long Strange Trip.
 The towers are in "B.M.O.C.", season 3, episode 9 of the series The White Shadow.
 The towers feature heavily in Episode 16 "Burn, baby, burn" of the sci-fi series Dark Skies. The episode is set during the Watts Riots of August 1965.
 Visiting... with Huell Howser Episode 109
The towers appear in the background in "Sally in the Alley", Season 1, Episode 4 of the TV series Southland.
The towers are featured in “Bitter Almonds”, Season 1, Episode 4 of the Netflix series From Scratch. Amy (Zoe Saldaña) visits the towers and later volunteers there in the children’s program.

Music
 A photograph of Simon Rodia is included on the cover of the Beatles' 1967 album Sgt. Pepper's Lonely Hearts Club Band.

 The cover of the US edition of his album Harold in the Land of Jazz (1958) shows Harold Land, playing a tenor saxophone while standing in front of the Watts Towers. 

 The cover of the US edition of his album Brown Rice (1975, released 1977) shows Don Cherry, pocket trumpet in hand, standing in front of the Watts Towers. 

 The song, “Good Time Boys”, on the Red Hot Chili Peppers’ 1989 album, Mother’s Milk’, references “…the mighty Watts Towers”.

 The music video for the song, “Hate It Or Love It ”, from the Game (rapper)’ 2005 album, The Documentary ’,  briefly features the Watss Towers.

 The song, “Come A Long Way”, on the Michelle Shocked’ 1992 album, Arkansas Traveler’, mentions “… All along the  Watts Tower”.

Radio
In an August 2017 episode of BBC Radio 4's The Museum of Curiosity, California-born textile artist Kaffe Fassett chose the Watts Towers as his hypothetical donation to this imaginary museum.

Video games

 The 2004 game Grand Theft Auto: San Andreas features the Jefferson Towers (also named as Sculpture Park) in the city of Los Santos, based on the Watts Towers.
 The 2005 street racing game LA Rush features the Watts Towers.
 The 2008 street racing game Midnight Club: Los Angeles features the Watts Towers.
 The 2013 game Grand Theft Auto V similarly features the Watts Towers, but in this version named as Rancho Towers.
 The 2014 game Wasteland 2 features the Watts Towers as part of the town of Rodia.

Watts Towers Arts Center
The Watts Towers Arts Center is an adjacent community arts center. The current facility opened in 1970.  Before that, the Center operated under a canopy next to the Towers. The center was built and staffed by the non-profit Committee for Simon Rodia's Towers in Watts. Changing displays of contemporary artworks are on exhibit, and tours of the Watts Towers are conducted by the center.  The Center's Charles Mingus Youth Arts Center holds art classes, primarily for youth and Special Needs adults from the local community and surrounding cities. Partnerships with CalArts and Sony Pictures provide media arts and piano classes. The Day of the Drum and Jazz Festival occurs annually on the last weekend of every September. It includes arts and craft booths and live music.

Watts Towers Crescent Greenway
Watts Towers Crescent Greenway is a .2 mile rail with trail bike–pedestrian path next to the Towers. It is the shortest open rail-trail in the U.S.

See also

Sources on local landmarks
 List of Registered Historic Places in Los Angeles.
 List of Los Angeles Historic-Cultural Monuments in South Los Angeles
 California Historical Landmarks in Los Angeles County, California
 National Register of Historic Places listings in Los Angeles, California

Other related "outsider art", Art Brut, or Italian-American naïve art 
United States
 Forestiere Underground Gardens in Fresno, built by Baldasare Forestiere, another Italian immigrant in California (born the same year as Rodia).
 Nitt Witt Ridge, an eclectic assemblage house in Cambria, California.
 Rubel Castle, a folk art sculptural house in Glendora, California.
 Bishop Castle, a massive stone castle hand built by Jim Bishop near Rye, Colorado.
 Mystery Castle, a house in Phoenix, Arizona, built in the 1930s in a similar style.
 Wharton Esherick Studio, built by American sculptor Wharton Esherick in Malvern, Pennsylvania.
 Coral Castle, a stone artwork and residence built in Homestead, Florida.
 Philadelphia's Magic Gardens, by mosaic artist Isaiah Zagar, an art space occupying three city lots created over the span of fourteen years.
 Heidelberg Project, a street in Detroit where houses have been turned into an outdoor art environment.
 Broken Angel House, in Clinton Hill, Brooklyn, designed with similar ad hoc construction for more than 30 years.
 Kea Tawana, Japanese-American sculptor who built an ark from architectural salvage in Newark, New Jersey
 Salvation Mountain, in Imperial County, CA, built by Leonard Knight.
 Noah Purifoy, an African American visual artist and sculptor who co-founded the Watts Towers Art Center and created the Noah Purifoy Outdoor Desert Art Museum near the Mojave Desert town of Joshua Tree, California.

International
 Edward James, surrealist poet inspired by Rodia. James built "Las Pozas" in San Luis Potosí state, México.
 Hermit House, a unique residence in Israel, with intricate mosaics created by an artist over thirty years.
 Ferdinand Cheval, a French postman who constructed an "ideal palace" out of rocks in his spare time.
 Rock Garden, Chandigarh, a rock garden built completely out of thrown-away items. The project was secretly initiated by Nek Chand.
 Justo Gallego Martínez, a Spaniard who built his own cathedral.
 Valerio Ricetti, an Italian immigrant in Australia who built the Hermit's Cave.
 Antoni Gaudí, Catalan architect with a similar Expressionist style, particularly La Sagrada Família in Barcelona.
 Jenő Bory, Hungarian architect and sculptor, who built Bory Castle with his own hands, construction lasted for 41 years.

References

External links

Watts Towers Arts Center
Simon Rodia State Historic Park website
Watts Towers on Great Buildings
The Towers — 1957 documentary
Image of Watts Towers, surrounded by scaffolding, undergoes pressure testing as people watch in Los Angeles, California, 1959. Los Angeles Times Photographic Archive (Collection 1429). UCLA Library Special Collections, Charles E. Young Research Library, University of California, Los Angeles.
 PBS article

1954 sculptures
Art in Greater Los Angeles
Art museums and galleries in Los Angeles
Buildings and structures in Los Angeles
Buildings and structures in Los Angeles County, California
Buildings and structures on the National Register of Historic Places in Los Angeles
California Historical Landmarks
California State Historic Parks
History of Los Angeles
Italian-American culture in Los Angeles
Landmarks in Los Angeles
Landmarks in Los Angeles County, California
Los Angeles Historic-Cultural Monuments
National Historic Landmarks in California
Open-air museums in California
Outdoor sculptures in Greater Los Angeles
Parks in Los Angeles
Steel sculptures in California
Tourist attractions in Los Angeles
Towers completed in 1954
Towers in California
Visionary environments
Watts, Los Angeles